Impeckable is Welsh rock band Budgie's seventh album, released in February 1978 on A&M Records. Guitarist Tony Bourge left the band after the album was released.

Track listing

Personnel
Budgie
Burke Shelley – bass guitar, vocals
Tony Bourge – guitar
Steve Williams – drums, percussion, vocals
Technical 
Budgie – record producer
Richard Manwaring – producer and audio engineer
Bob Leth – assistant engineer
Michael Ross – album art director
Nick Marshall – album art design
Sally Anne Thompson – cat photography
Hans Reinhard – bird photography
Mastered at Sterling Sound in New York City

Covers

American thrash metal band Megadeth released a cover of "Melt the Ice Away" as a Spotify bonus track on their 2016 album Dystopia.

References

Budgie (band) albums
1978 albums
A&M Records albums